Morteza Pouraliganji (born 19 April 1992) is an Iranian professional footballer who plays as a centre-back for Persian Gulf Pro League club Persepolis and Iran national team.

He represented Iran at the 2015 AFC Asian Cup, 2018 FIFA World Cup and the 2019 AFC Asian Cup.

Early life
Pouraliganji was born in Pain Ganj Afruz, a village in Babol County.

Club career

Naft Tehran
Pouraliganji started his senior career with Naft Tehran in 2010. He scored his first professional goal in 2011 in a 4–1 win against Paykan.

Tianjin Teda
He joined Chinese Super League club Tianjin Teda on 25 February 2015 with a one–year contract. He made his first appearance for the club on 8 April 2015 in a match against Henan Jianye. On 4 June 2015 Pouraliganji scored his first goal for Tianjin in a 2–2 draw against Guangzhou Evergrande. He left the club at the end of the season after he decided not to renew his contract.

Al Sadd
On 8 January 2016 Pouraliganji rejected several offers from European and Chinese teams and accepted an offer from Qatar Stars League club Al Sadd. He said that playing with Xavi was one of the main reasons he accepted this offer. He signed a four-month contract on 20 January 2016 until the end of the season. He scored his first goal for his new club in February 2016 in a 3–1 victory against Al Arabi.

Pouralingaji decided to remain with Al Sadd for another season and he scored his first league goal of the 2016–17 season on 12 December 2016 in an 8–0 win against Umm Salal. He scored again in the following match day on 16 December 2016 in a 3–1 victory against Al-Sailiya SC.

Persepolis 
On 6 June 2022, Pouraliganji joined Persian Gulf Pro League side Persepolis on a two-year deal.

International career

Youth
Pouraliganji represented Iran U-17 in the 2009 FIFA U-17 World Cup.

In 2012, he broke in to coach Ali Reza Mansourian's squad and has been a regular feature ever since. He was named in the Iran U23 final list for Incheon 2014.

Senior
After his performance in Asian Games in October 2014, Carlos Queiroz called Pouraliganji up for a training camp in Portugal. He played a friendly fixtures against Estroli and Benfica and was later called up for an international friendly against South Korea on 18 November 2014. He was called into Iran's 2015 AFC Asian Cup squad on 30 December 2014, making his debut in a friendly match against Iraq on 4 January 2015 which Iran won 1–0.

Pouraliganji was selected to start in Iran's opening match at the 2015 AFC Asian Cup, a 2–0 win over Bahrain. His good performance in Iran's second match against Qatar earned him a place in the AFC Best 11 of Round 2. In the quarter-final match against Iraq, Pouraliganji scored his first goal for Iran as they drew 3–3 at Canberra Stadium and were eventually defeated 7–6 on a penalty shootout.

In May 2018 he was named in Iran's preliminary squad for the 2018 FIFA World Cup in Russia.

Career statistics

Club

International
Statistics accurate as of match played 29 November 2022 .

International goals
Scores and results list Iran's goal tally first.

Iran U23

Iran

Honours

Club
Al-Sadd
Qatar Crown Prince Cup: 2017
Qatar Emir Cup: 2017
Sheikh Jassim Cup: 2017

References

External links
 

1992 births
Living people
Iranian footballers
2015 AFC Asian Cup players
Iran international footballers
Iranian expatriate footballers
Naft Tehran F.C. players
Tianjin Jinmen Tiger F.C. players
Al Sadd SC players
K.A.S. Eupen players
Al-Arabi SC (Qatar) players
Shenzhen F.C. players
Expatriate footballers in China
Persian Gulf Pro League players
Chinese Super League players
Qatar Stars League players
Belgian Pro League players
People from Babol
Association football central defenders
Association football defenders
Footballers at the 2014 Asian Games
Expatriate footballers in Qatar
Iranian expatriate sportspeople in Qatar
2018 FIFA World Cup players
Expatriate footballers in Belgium
2019 AFC Asian Cup players
Asian Games competitors for Iran
Iranian expatriate sportspeople in Belgium
Iranian expatriate sportspeople in China
Sportspeople from Mazandaran province
Persepolis F.C. players
2022 FIFA World Cup players
21st-century Iranian people